Special service (also: special radiocommunication service ) is – according to Article 1.60 of the International Telecommunication Union's (ITU) Radio Regulations (RR) – defined as "A radiocommunication service, not otherwise defined in this Section (ITU, RR, Section III – Radio services), carried on exclusively for specific needs of general utility, and not open to public correspondence."

However, the meaning of public correspondence is – according to the International Telecommunication Convention – defined as "Any telecommunication which the offices and radio stations must, by reason of their being at the disposal of the public, accept for transmission."

See also 
 Radio station
 Radiocommunication service

References

External links
 International Telecommunication Union (ITU)

Radiocommunication services ITU